Apatelomyces is a fungal genus in the family Laboulbeniaceae. A monotypic genus, Apatelomyces contains the single species Apatelomyces ogmoceri.

See also
List of Laboulbeniaceae genera

References

Laboulbeniomycetes
Monotypic Laboulbeniales genera